The 2021–22 season was the 101st season in the existence of S.C. Braga and the club's 26th consecutive season in the top flight of Portuguese football. In addition to the domestic league, Braga participated in this season's editions of the Taça de Portugal, the Taça da Liga, the Supertaça Cândido de Oliveira and the UEFA Europa League.

Players

First-team squad

Others players under contract

Out on loan

Transfers

Pre-season and friendlies

Competitions

Overall record

Primeira Liga

League table

Results summary

Results by round

Matches

Taça de Portugal

Taça da Liga

Third round

Supertaça Cândido de Oliveira

UEFA Europa League

Group stage

The draw for the group stage was held on 27 August 2021.

Knockout phase

Knockout round play-offs
The Knockout round play-offs draw was held on 13 December 2021.

Round of 16
The draw for the round of 16 was held on 25 February 2022.

Quarter-finals
The draw for the quarter-finals was held on 18 March 2022.

References

S.C. Braga seasons
Braga
2021–22 UEFA Europa League participants seasons